Miloš Ostojić (born 21 April 1996) is a Serbian football goalkeeper who plays for Radnik Surdulica.

Club career

Early years
Born in Sombor, Ostojić passed OFK Beograd youth categories. After he was nominated for the best goalkeeper in academy in 2012 and 2013, he signed his first professional contract with club at the beginning of 2014. As the first team member, Ostojić spent a period between 2013 and 2015, but without senior appearances. In summer 2015, when he overgrown youth selection, he decided to leave the club. Later he moved to Croatian First Football League side Istra 1961, where he spent the 2015–16 season as an option, without official caps. He was also involved in the incident on training in November 2015, when he was beaten by teammate Stefan Nikolić. In 2016, he signed with Voždovac, but closely moved on loan to Belgrade Zone League side Hajduk Beograd in last days of the summer transfer window.

Spartak Subotica
Ostojić joined Spartak Subotica at the beginning of 2017 and spent some period on trial, playing several friendly matches during the winter break off-season. He signed a contract with club along with experienced Bojan Jović, who started the spring half-season as the first choice goalkeeper. Ostojić made his professional debut for new club under coach Andrey Chernyshov in the 24 fixture home match against Čukarički, played on 4 March 2017. In May 2018, Ostojić injured ligaments during training, after which he missed the last fixture match of the 2017–18 Serbian SuperLiga campaign against Partizan.

International career
At the beginning of 2011, Ostojić was selected in Serbian under-15 national selection, after which he was also called Serbian national levels under 16 and 17 years until 2013. In summer 2013, Ostojić got a debut call-up into the Serbia u19 team under coach Veljko Paunović and made his debut for the team at the memorial tournament "Stevan Vilotić - Ćele", in a match played on 7 September against Ukraine. He also made his debut for Serbia U18 in December of the same year, where he stayed as a member until 2014. As a coach of Serbia U19 team, Ivan Tomić also invited him into the squad in 2014, when he also capped once time. Ostojić was called into the Serbia U20 under coach Milan Obradović in June 2017, when he made his debut for the team in a friendly match against Israel. Ostojić got his first call in Serbian under-21 team by coach Goran Đorović in August 2017. He made his debut for the team in away friendly against Qatar U23 team on 17 December 2017.

Career statistics

References

External links
 
 
 
 

1996 births
Living people
Sportspeople from Sombor
Association football goalkeepers
Serbian footballers
Serbia youth international footballers
Serbian expatriate footballers
NK Istra 1961 players
OFK Beograd players
FK Voždovac players
FK Hajduk Beograd players
FK Spartak Subotica players
FK Kolubara players
FK Napredak Kruševac players
FK Novi Pazar players
FK Radnik Surdulica players
Serbian SuperLiga players
Serbian First League players
Serbia under-21 international footballers
Serbian expatriate sportspeople in Croatia
Expatriate footballers in Croatia